Michael Uzoukwu Absalom Jude Ihiekwe (born 20 November 1992) is an English professional footballer who plays as a centre-back for Sheffield Wednesday.

Career

Wolverhampton Wanderers
Ihiekwe was a member of his local side, Liverpool's academy system, before he was released during the 2010–11 season.

He soon joined the youth ranks of Wolverhampton Wanderers, with whom he signed a professional contract in 2011. In May 2012, Ihiekwe signed a contract extension after the club activated a one-year options. Although primarily only involved in youth fixtures, he has twice been an unused substitute for Wolves' first team during the 2013–14 season.

He joined League Two side Cheltenham Town initially on a month-long loan in January 2014. Ihiekwe then made his senior debut on 25 January 2014 in a 1–1 draw at Plymouth Argyle, with his loan then being extended to run until the end of the season, during which he made 13 appearances.

The defender's contract at Wolves expired in summer 2014, and he departed after not making any appearances for the club.

Tranmere Rovers
After being released by Wolves, Ihiekwe signed a two-year deal with League Two side Tranmere Rovers on 18 June 2014. Upon joining the club, Ihiekwe stated he was determined to fight for his place in the first team and was given number five shirt ahead of the new season.

Ihiekwe made his Tranmere Rovers debut in the opening game of the season, a 1–1 draw against York City, where he played 90 minutes. Since his debut, Ihiekwe established himself in the starting eleven at centre-back throughout the season. On 1 November 2014, Ihiekwe scored his first Tranmere Rovers goal, in a 2–2 draw against Stevenage. However, during the season, Ihiekwe suffered ankle injury during the match against Cambridge United after a challenge that saw him stretchered off the field. The injury wasn't serious and he made his return to the first team weeks later, in a 6–2 FA Cup third round loss against Swansea City. His return was short-lived when he suffered an injury three weeks later that kept him out for weeks. After recovering, Ihiekwe made his return to the first team, coming on as a substitute for Rory Donnelly in the 81st minute, in a 3–2 loss against Portsmouth on 24 February 2015. He regained his first team place towards the end of the season, but was unable to help the club, as they were relegated to the Conference Premier. Ihiekwe made thirty-eight appearances for the club in his first season at Tranmere Rovers.

The 2015–16 season saw Ihiekwe given shirt number twelve, with Steve Jennings taking over the number five shirt. Ihiekwe started well, scoring his first goal of the season in a 4–1 win over Gateshead. However, Ihiekwe was soon sidelined for months with a hamstring injury. After making his first team return in a 1–1 draw against Halifax Town on 19 December 2015, Ihiekwe scored his second goal of the season seven days later on 26 December 2015, in a 2–1 win over Macclesfield Town. Since his return, Ihielkwe managed to regain his first team place for the whole season, as he made thirty-five appearances, but was unsuccessful to help the club get back to promotion to League Two. After scoring a late winner against Sutton United in 2017  Ihiekwe was quoted as saying "That will kill Lincoln"  Ihiekwe in making his statement was a little premature as Lincoln Then went on to secure their next 6 games undefeated and won the National title gaining promotion back to the football League. As the season progress, Ihiekwe began to play in a full-back position, rather than at centre-back, under the management of Gary Brabin. At the end of the 2015–16 season, Ihiekwe was offered a new contract and signed a one-year contract extension on 1 June 2016.

Rotherham United
On 25 May 2017, Rotherham United announced that Ihiekwe had signed a two-year contract with the League One club. As well as scoring during pre season, Ihiekwe scored his first competitive goal for Rotherham in a 5-1 home win against Oldham.

On 24 August 2018, Ihiekwe joined Accrington Stanley on loan until 2 January 2019.

Sheffield Wednesday
On 22 June 2022, Ihiekwe would join Sheffield Wednesday following the expiration of his Rotherham United contract. He made his Wednesday debut, starting against Portsmouth on 30 July 2022. Manager Darren Moore confirmed that Ihiekwe has sustained knee ligament damage on 3 December 2022 and would have an extended stay in the recovery room.

International career
Ihiekwe was born in England and is of Nigerian descent. In September 2015, Ihiekwe was called up by England C.

Career statistics

Honours
Rotherham United
League One runner-up: 2021–22
EFL Trophy: 2021–22

Individual
PFA Team of the Year: 2019–20 League One, 2021–22 League One

References

External links

1992 births
Living people
Footballers from Liverpool
English footballers
Association football defenders
Wolverhampton Wanderers F.C. players
Cheltenham Town F.C. players
Tranmere Rovers F.C. players
Rotherham United F.C. players
Sheffield Wednesday F.C. players
Accrington Stanley F.C. players
English Football League players
English people of Nigerian descent